The M49 expressway is a planned  long expressway in Hungary that will link the M3 motorway to the border with Romania near Csenger, connecting with Romania's A14 motorway towards Satu Mare. Upon completion, it will serve as a continuation of the Romanian high-speed road to Budapest, the capital of Hungary.

See also
Roads in Hungary
Transport in Hungary

References

Highways in Hungary